Igor Vyacheslavovich Pyvin (born 4 August 1967) is a Russian professional football coach and a former player.

Playing career
As a player, he made his debut in the Soviet Second League in 1984 for FC Strela Voronezh.

References

1967 births
Footballers from Voronezh
Living people
Soviet footballers
Russian footballers
Association football midfielders
Association football defenders
Russian expatriate footballers
FC Fakel Voronezh players
Russian Premier League players
Strindheim IL players
Expatriate footballers in Norway
Russian expatriate sportspeople in Norway
Eliteserien players
Russian football managers
FC Fakel Voronezh managers
JK Narva Trans managers
FC Znamya Truda Orekhovo-Zuyevo managers
Russian expatriate football managers
Expatriate football managers in Estonia
Russian expatriate sportspeople in Estonia